Alfred John Day Diver (6 July 1823 – 25 March 1876) was an English first-class cricketer whose career spanned the 1843 season to the 1866 season.  Diver played mainly for Cambridge Town Club (aka Cambridgeshire) and also played for Middlesex and Nottinghamshire.

Popularly known as "Ducky", Diver is best known as a reliable batsman for various All-England Eleven teams.  Following the 1859 English cricket season, he was one of the 12-strong party of English players who toured North America. Led by George Parr, this was the first ever overseas cricket tour.

His nephew, Edwin Diver, played over 200 first-class games, mostly for Surrey and Warwickshire.

External sources

 
 Statistical summary from CricketArchive

Further reading
 
 
 
 

1823 births
1876 deaths
English cricketers
All-England Eleven cricketers
Cambridge Town Club cricketers
English cricketers of 1826 to 1863
Manchester Cricket Club cricketers
Marylebone Cricket Club cricketers
Middlesex cricketers
North v South cricketers
Nottinghamshire cricketers
Players cricketers